The boys' horizontal bar competition at the 2018 Summer Youth Olympics was held at the America Pavilion on 15 October.

Qualification

Final

References

External links
Qualification results 
Final results 

Boys' horizontal bar